Alberdi Department is a department of Santiago del Estero Province, Argentina in the region of the Chaco Santiagueño. It is bordered on the north by Copo Department, on the east by Chaco Province, on the south by Moreno Department and Figueroa Department, and on the west by the Salado River which separates it from the Jiménez Department and Pellegrini Department. Its head town is Campo Gallo.

The department was created by provincial law No. 782, which was adopted on June 27, 1921, which modified the law No. 353 and dividing Copo Department to create Alberdi Department.

Other cities and towns 

 Agustina Libarona
 Coronel Manuel Leoncio Rico
 El Setenta
 Huachana
 Las Carpas
 San Gregorio
 Villa Palmar

References 

Departments of Santiago del Estero Province